The Hollywood Music in Media Award for Best Music Supervision – Film is one of the awards given annually to people working in the motion picture industry by the Hollywood Music in Media Awards (HMMA).

History
It is presented to the music supervisors who have overseen music for a production. The award was first given in 2014, during the fifth annual awards.

Winners and nominees

2010s

2020s

References

Best Music Supervision - Film
Awards established in 2014
2014 establishments in the United States